James Howard Brown (May 18, 1884, Jacksonville, Illinois – February 10, 1956, Baltimore, Maryland) was an American professor of bacteriology. He was the president of the American Society for Microbiology in 1931.

Biography
J. Howard Brown graduated in 1906 with a B.S. from Illinois College and in 1909 with an M.S. from the University of Illinois Urbana-Champaign. In the department of comparative pathology of Harvard Medical School, he was from 1910 to 1917 an assistant and an Austin teaching fellow. In 1917 he received his Ph.D. in comparative pathology from Harvard University. In the department of animal pathology of the Rockefeller Institute for Medical Research, he was from 1917 to 1919 an assistant and from 1919 to 1923 an associate. At Harvard and at the Rockefeller Institute, Theobald Smith was his mentor. During WW I, Brown was a civilian in charge of production, at the Army Auxiliary Laboratory Number One, of immune serum for the U.S. Army and U.S. Navy. In 1923 he joined the faculty in the department of pathology and bacteriology of the Johns Hopkins School of Medicine and continued there for the remainder of his career. He was the author or co-author of over 100 scientific publications.

J. Howard Brown is best known for his pioneering work on the biochemical characterization and differentiation of the streptococci, but he also did research on many other bacteria. He did research on blood transfusion, nephritis, pertussis, the preservation of bacteria in vacuo by freeze drying, and development of devices for culturing bacteria. In 1926 he was elected the president of the American Association of Medical Milk Commissions. He, with William Dodge Frost and Myrtle Shaw, developed methods of culturing bacteria to differentiate between streptococci of bovine and human origin.

In 1929 Illinois College awarded him an honorary Doctor of Science degree. In 1933 he was elected a Fellow of the American Association for the Advancement of Science. The Maryland Branch of the American Society for Microbiology established in his honor the J. Howard Brown award, given annually to Maryland's outstanding graduate student bacteriologist.

In 1910 he married Dessau Duncan (1886–1974). They had two children, Thomas Duncan Brown (1911–1946) and Hazel Anne Brown (1919–2009).

Selected publications

Articles
 
 
 
 
 
 
  reprint in The Veterinary Bulletin; abstract

Books and monographs

References

1884 births
1956 deaths
American bacteriologists
Illinois College alumni
University of Illinois Urbana-Champaign alumni
Harvard Medical School alumni
Rockefeller University people
Johns Hopkins School of Medicine faculty
Fellows of the American Association for the Advancement of Science